The Amarela is a Portuguese breed of domestic chicken. This breed originated in Portugal and is endangered with less than two thousand females in existence.

Population
In 2013 a population of 2677–2956 was reported to DAD-IS.

Uses
The Amarela is a dual-purpose breed, meaning it is raised for both meat and eggs.

See also
 Chicken
 List of chicken breeds

References

Chicken breeds originating in Portugal
Chicken breeds